Lazer Creek is a stream in the U.S. state of Georgia. It is a tributary to Flint River.

Lazer Creek most likely was named after a pioneer settler. The precise identity of namesake Lazer is unknown.

References

Rivers of Georgia (U.S. state)
Rivers of Meriwether County, Georgia
Rivers of Talbot County, Georgia